Rhinolophus bat coronavirus HKU2 (Chinese horseshoe bat virus; Bat-CoV HKU2) is a novel enveloped, single-stranded positive-sense RNA virus species in the Alphacoronavirus, or Group 1, genus with a corona-like morphology.

Genome 
RH-BAT-Cov-HKU2 shares a common evolutionary origin in the spike protein of Bat-SARS CoV. This spike protein shares similar deletions with group 2 coronaviruses in the C-terminus.

See also
Murinae
Zoonosis

References

External links
  (World Health Organization, Eastern Mediterranean Health Journal, supplement on coronavirus)
 
 Virus Pathogen Database and Analysis Resource (ViPR): Coronaviridae
 German Research Foundation (Coronavirus Consortium)

 

Alphacoronaviruses
Animal viral diseases
Bat diseases